The Godbille GJJ is a French variant of the Piper PA-20 Pacer, first flown in 1961.

Design
In 1961 Jacques and Jules Godbille built a three-seat light aircraft based on the structure of the Piper PA-20 Pacer. Powered by a  Lycoming O-235-C air-cooled flat four engine rather than the Pacer's more usual  Lycoming O-290-D, the closest Piper variant was the PA-20S 115. The engine cowlings of the Piper and Gobille are distinct, the latter having a wide open nose and a gap at its rear rather than merging smoothly into the fuselage.  The Godbille's wing tips are square and fitted with tip plates, whereas the Piper's are rounded, and the Godbille's vertical tail is taller than the Piper's and straight edged rather than curved.

Operational history
The sole Godbille GJJ was registered on 7 December 1961 and flew for the first time before the end of the year.  The Godbilles retained it for a decade but after that it changed hands rapidly, with eight different owners before 1988. It remains on the French Civil Aircraft Register in 2014.

References

Homebuilt aircraft
1960s French sport aircraft
Single-engined tractor aircraft
High-wing aircraft
Aircraft first flown in 1961